Peter Szymon Serafinowicz (born 10 July 1972) is an English actor, comedian, director, and screenwriter. He is best known for his roles in numerous British and American comedy series, and film roles such as the voice of Darth Maul in Star Wars: Episode I – The Phantom Menace (1999), Pete in Shaun of the Dead (2004), and The Sommelier in John Wick Chapter 2 (2017). He also appeared as the title character in the live-action series of The Tick (2016), received attention in the late 2010s for political satire videos in which he dubbed over videos of Donald Trump with various comedic voices, and has directed music videos for acts such as Hot Chip.

Early life
Peter Szymon Serafinowicz was born into a Catholic family in the Gateacre area of Liverpool on 10 July 1972, the son of post office worker Catherine (née Geary) and scaffolder Szymon Serafinowicz. His father, a native of Surrey who later moved to Liverpool, was born to a Polish mother and Belarusian father. He has a brother named James, who became a film producer, and a sister named Helen, who became a writer and was married to Irish comedy writer Graham Linehan from 2004 to 2021 after Serafinowicz introduced them.

At the age of three, Serafinowicz moved with his family to the Belle Vale area of Liverpool, where he attended Our Lady of the Assumption Primary School. The family moved back to Gateacre when he was 14, and he attended St Francis Xavier's College in the neighbouring Woolton suburb. He later said, "I had a very happy childhood, but Belle Vale was very rough. I was only about three when we moved there, but I can still remember it looking very shiny, and it was all landscaped. But it was a very poor area, and it became scruffy quite quickly. [...] Gateacre is traditionally seen as one of the posh areas of Liverpool. It wasn't really that much posher!"

Career

Serafinowicz made his broadcasting debut in 1993 on Radio 1 show The Knowledge, a spoof documentary about the music industry. From there he went on to perform in Radio 4 shows Week Ending, Harry Hill's Fruit Corner, Grievous Bodily Radio, The Two Dannys and A Whole New Ball Game.

On 1 May 1997, he appeared in The Election Night Armistice as Moz Bingham, the fictional press secretary to the then shadow Chancellor of the Exchequer Gordon Brown, who verbally abuses the BBC's Nick Robinson in a spoof phone call over the politician's news coverage. In 1998 he appeared on TV in Comedy Nation and You Are Here. He also had a role in the sitcom How Do You Want Me? penned by Simon Nye.

In 1999, he had a few guest appearances in the Channel 4 sitcom Spaced, playing protagonist Tim Bisley's (Simon Pegg) nemesis, Duane Benzie. He made another cameo appearance in the series when it returned in 2001.

In 2001, he took the lead in BBC Two sitcom World of Pub, playing the same character as he had done in the show's run on Radio 4. He appeared in The Junkies, an Internet sitcom. In 2002, the critically acclaimed Look Around You, a series of 10-minute 1970s school science video spoofs, debuted on BBC Two in which he played a scientist. He co-wrote the show with Robert Popper, whom he met on the set of Spaced. The show returned in 2005 as a spoof of the 1980s show Tomorrow's World, with Serafinowicz playing Peter Packard, one of the presenters.

In 2003, he appeared in another sitcom written by Nye, Hardware, in which he played the affable Kenny. He reprised this role in the second series in 2004. Also in 2004 he appeared in British romantic zombie comedy Shaun of the Dead, playing Pete, the uptight flatmate of principal characters Shaun and Ed. He appeared in boxing film The Calcium Kid. 

In Sixty Six, the 2006 British film about a Jewish boy whose bar mitzvah is scheduled for the same day as the 1966 FIFA World Cup Final, Serafinowicz plays Uncle Jimmy. In the week before the 2006 Academy Awards a video circulated on the Internet of a fake news item (called "O! News", a parody of E! News) about a new Oscar statue, in which Serafinowicz imitated Alan Alda, Paul McCartney and Al Pacino. 

A second "O! News" video later appeared, parodying the 2006 Apple Corps v Apple Computer lawsuit. This attracted the interest of the BBC, and a pilot was commissioned for The Peter Serafinowicz Show. A full series was broadcast on BBC Two in 2007 (with a Christmas special in 2008). For his performance, Serafinowicz was presented with the Best Entertainer prize at the 2008 Rose d'Or ceremony. The series was also nominated for Best Comedy Programme at the 2009 BAFTA Television Awards.

Serafinowicz made guest appearances on television, including the comedy shows Smack the Pony and Hippies (both 1999), Black Books (2000), I'm Alan Partridge (2002) and Little Britain (2003), comedy-drama Murder Most Horrid (1999), ITV drama series Agatha Christie's Marple (2006) and Parks and Recreation (2013). 

He made a number of guest appearances on both television and radio panel shows. He regularly appeared on The 99p Challenge and appeared on Have I Got News for You in 2005, 2006 and 2008, 8 Out of 10 Cats in 2005, and QI in 2003. He also appeared on Friday Night with Jonathan Ross on 19 October 2007, Would I Lie to You? on 8 August 2008 and 30 July 2010 and Never Mind the Buzzcocks on 15 October 2009.

In 2008, Serafinowicz was working with Robert Popper on a new television series and website, based on a spoof religion "Tarvuism" for US network Adult Swim. In 2009, he appeared in Universal Films' Couples Retreat as Sctanley, the manager of the Eden Resort, directed by Peter Billingsley.

In 2010, Serafinowicz directed the music video for Hot Chip's song "I Feel Better", their second single from the album One Life Stand. He followed this up in 2012 when he directed the music video for the band's song "Night & Day", the first single from their album In Our Heads. 

In 2010, he co-starred with Will Arnett in the FOX sitcom Running Wilde, devised by Arrested Development creator Mitchell Hurwitz. It premiered on Fox on 21 September 2010, but was cancelled by the network after 13 episodes.

In June 2013, Serafinowicz provided the English language audiobook recording for the Roald Dahl novel Danny, the Champion of the World. In July 2013, he made his film directing debut with the dark comedy film I See What You Did There, which he wrote, along with Danny Wallace.

In 2014, it was announced that Serafinowicz would play the role of Crowley in the BBC Radio 4 adaption of Terry Pratchett and Neil Gaiman's novel Good Omens.

That same year, he was featured in Guardians of the Galaxy playing Garthan Saal, a Denarian ranking pilot of the Nova Corps. He appeared in Series 9 of Doctor Who as the voice of The Fisher King.

During 2016, Serafinowicz created a series of YouTube videos entitled "Sassy Trump", in which he redubed speeches given by Donald Trump with a camp voice. Those videos were deleted from his YouTube channel in 2020. He has also created parodies dubbing Trump with a Cockney accent and a posh English accent.

Due to Serafinowicz's impersonation of Paul McCartney, Matt Berry sang a duet with him on Berry's 2009 album Witchazel. The track in question was "Rain Came Down", where he was billed as "Paul McCartney".

He stars in the title role of Amazon's The Tick, the pilot for which premiered on 19 August 2016. In 2020 Serafinowicz guest starred in the second season of TBS' Miracle Workers.

Personal life
Serafinowicz met actress Sarah Alexander sometime around 2002, while she was in a relationship with actor Gerald Harper. She left Harper for Serafinowicz in 2002, and the two later married. They live in West London, and have a son and a daughter.

In October 2007, Serafinowicz dropped his attempt to use the Human Rights Act against the national newspapers; he had sought to prevent the publication of details revealing that his grandfather, Szymon Serafinowicz, was a member of the Belarusian Auxiliary Police who became the first man in the UK to be tried under the War Crimes Act. Szymon was charged with direct involvement in three murders and personal involvement in the destruction of the Jewish populations of Mir and Minsk, including the 1941 massacre of the Mir Ghetto which resulted in the deaths of 1,800 people, but was found unfit for trial on grounds of dementia in 1997 and died later that year at the age of 86.

Filmography

Film

Television

Video games

References

External links

 
 
 

1972 births
Living people
20th-century English male actors
21st-century English male actors
Comedians from Liverpool
English male comedians
English male film actors
English male television actors
English male video game actors
English male voice actors
English male writers
English people of Belarusian descent
English people of Polish descent
Male actors from Liverpool
People from Gateacre